Beer can chicken (also known as chicken on a throne, beer butt chicken, coq au can, dancing chicken) is a barbecued chicken dish and method of indirect grilling using a partially-filled can of beer that is placed in the chicken's cavity prior to cooking.  The chicken is then stood up on the can and its legs vertically, and slow-cooked over indirect heat, usually over a propane gas or charcoal grill. The process is meant to add moisture to the dish, and some believe that steam from the beer serves to steam the chicken from the inside and add flavor to the dish. Some people are avid proponents of the dish, while others have contended that the efficacy of using the beer is overrated, and that the science regarding beer can chicken is debatable. It has been suggested that the dish possibly originated in the U.S. state of Louisiana.

Overview
Beer can chicken is a barbecued chicken dish and method of indirect grilling, in which an open can of beer or other canned beverage is inserted into the cavity of a chicken and then used to hold the chicken vertically while it cooks on a grill or in an oven. During the cooking process the beer in the can might steam, which might add moisture in the cavity of the bird, and some theorize that the beer vapor serves to add flavor to the dish. Because the chicken is in an upright position, the fat in the bird drains away and the skin is evenly cooked.

Prior to cooking, some of the beer in the can is typically removed, with a partially-full can of beer placed inside the bird's cavity. Some cooks use a full can of beer. Some cooks use a standard 12-ounce beer (355 ml) can, while others use a tallboy beer can, a larger-sized can. The chicken is sometimes coated with a spice rub prior to cooking, and some use marinated chicken.

Some people are enthusiastic proponents of the dish, while others feel that the dish and process is overrated. It has been stated that the efficacy of the beer serving to steam whole chickens from the inside and adding flavor is debatable. Some critics of beer can chicken exist; one critic referred to the practice as "dangerous" and "a waste of good beer". Another critic stated that the process may actually make the chicken drier compared to other types of roasting, and it has also been stated by some cooking experts that the beer does not reach a boiling point, and therefore does not steam.

History
Barbecue author Steven Raichlen helped popularize the dish on a global level.  He has promoted the dish since 1996, when he first observed its preparation in the Memphis in May World Championship Barbecue Cooking Contest. He has suggested that beer can chicken likely originated in the U.S. state of Louisiana. Raichlen has reported recipes for beer can chicken appearing around the same time in Mississippi, Texas, and Kansas.  "There is a definite Louisiana connection."  Famous barbecue judge Ardie Davis compared the emergence of beer can chicken to the domestication of animals: "It just happened everywhere at once."

Beer can chicken may have been prepared throughout the American South in the 1980s; however, the first documentation can be found in the Houston Chronicle in 1993.  The recipe was given by Wayne Whitworth to George H. W. Bush when he and his brothers built a barbecue for the president. The barbecue pits were sent to Camp David at the beginning of President Bush's term.

As fast food
In October 2014, Popeyes Louisiana Kitchen sold a limited edition beer can chicken dish that was produced without the use of beer. The dish consisted of sliced chicken breast meat marinated in a spice mixture designed to mimic the flavor of beer can chicken, which was then battered and deep fried. The spice mixture was composed of butter, onion, garlic, rosemary, lemon zest, cayenne pepper and a "secret ingredient" that Popeyes did not disclose. The company's chief marketing officer stated to a press source that the company had "... been working on the Beer Can Chicken for years".

See also

 Beer bread
 Beer cake
 Beer soup 
 List of chicken dishes
 Rotisserie chicken

Notes

References

Bibliography

Further reading

External links

 Beer can chicken. BBC Good Food.

Barbecue
American chicken dishes
Beer dishes